Suri (Churi, Dhuri, Shuri, Shuro), is a Surmic language spoken in the West Omo Zone of the South West Ethiopia Peoples' Region in Ethiopia, to the South Sudan border by the Suri. The language has over 80% lexical similarity to Mursi. The language is often referred to by another form of its name, Surma, after which the Surmic branch of Eastern Sudanic is named, but that form is frequently used for the three related languages spoken by the Surma people: Suri, Mursi, and Me'en.

Suri is spoken in two dialect by two nationalities, the Tirma (Tirmaga, Cirma, Dirma, Terema, Terna, Tid, Tirima, Tirmagi) and the Chai (Caci, Cai).

References

Bibliography
 Abbink, Jon, Michael Bryant & Daniel Bambu. 2013. Suri Orature: An Introduction to the Society, Language and Oral Culture of the Suri People (Southwest Ethiopia). Cologne: R. Köppe Publishers, 203 pp..
Bryant, Mike and Bargola Olekibo, compilers. 1997. Surichen ko aranjacan ko golacan (Suri–English–Amharic dictionary). 2nd ed. S.l.: Surma Translation Project. 65 p.
Bryant, Michael G. 1999. Aspects of Tirmaga Grammar. MA thesis. University of Texas, Arlington.
Last, Marco and Deborah Lucassen. 1998. "A Grammatical Sketch on Chai, a Southeastern Surmic Language". in: Dimmendaal, Gerrit and Marco Last (eds.) Surmic Languages and Cultures. Rüdiger Köppe Verlag, Köln. pp. 375–436.
Unseth, Peter. 1997. "Disentangling the Two Languages Called 'Suri'". Occasional Papers in the Study of Sudanese Languages 7: 49-69.
Last, Marco and Deborah Lucassen. 1998. "Violence and Political Discourse Among the Chai Suri". in: Dimmendaal, Gerrit and Marco Last (eds.) Surmic Languages and Cultures. Rüdiger Köppe Verlag, Köln. pp. 323.

External links
  Endangered Languages Project -- Suri
  Surma People
 Suri basic lexicon at the Global Lexicostatistical Database

Languages of Ethiopia
Surmic languages